"Fejn Staħbejtli" (Where have you hidden from me) is a song by Maltese singer Ira Losco. It won The Independence Song Contest at Festival Kanzunetta Indipendenza 2001. It was written by Paul Ellul and composed by Mark Spiteri Lucas.

2001 songs
Ira Losco songs
Maltese-language songs